In September 2016, the International Union for Conservation of Nature (IUCN) listed 507 endangered mollusc species. Of all evaluated mollusc species, 7.0% are listed as endangered. 
The IUCN also lists nine mollusc subspecies as endangered.

No subpopulations of molluscs have been evaluated by the IUCN.

For a species to be considered endangered by the IUCN it must meet certain quantitative criteria which are designed to classify taxa facing "a very high risk of extinction". An even higher risk is faced by critically endangered species, which meet the quantitative criteria for endangered species. Critically endangered molluscs are listed separately. There are 1088 mollusc species which are endangered or critically endangered.

Additionally 1988 mollusc species (27% of those evaluated) are listed as data deficient, meaning there is insufficient information for a full assessment of conservation status. As these species typically have small distributions and/or populations, they are intrinsically likely to be threatened, according to the IUCN. While the category of data deficient indicates that no assessment of extinction risk has been made for the taxa, the IUCN notes that it may be appropriate to give them "the same degree of attention as threatened taxa, at least until their status can be assessed".

This is a complete list of endangered mollusc species and subspecies evaluated by the IUCN.

Gastropods
There are 448 species and seven subspecies of gastropod assessed as endangered.

Stylommatophora
Stylommatophora is a very diverse group that includes the majority of land snails and slugs. There are 187 species and two subspecies in the order Stylommatophora assessed as endangered.

Partulids

Achatinellids

Cerastids

Endodontids

Charopids

Helicarionids

Orthalicids
Species

Subspecies
Orthalicus reses reses (Stock Island tree snail)

Euconulids

Streptaxids
Species

Subspecies
Tayloria urguessensis subangulata

Camaenids

Helicids

Hygromiids

Other stylommatophoran species

Littorinimorpha
There are 147 littorinimorph species and three subspecies assessed as endangered.

Hydrobiids

Bithyniids
Species

Subspecies

Assimineids

Pomatiopsids

Other Littorinimorpha species

Sorbeoconcha

Architaenioglossa
Species

Subspecies
Bellamya unicolor abyssinicus
Maizania hildebrandti thikensis

Cycloneritimorpha

Hygrophila species
There are 22 Hygrophila species assessed as endangered.

Planorbids

Lymnaeids

Neogastropoda

Other gastropod species

Bivalvia
There are 57 species and two subspecies in the class Bivalvia assessed as endangered.

Unionida
There are 54 species and two subspecies in the order Unionoida assessed as endangered.

Margaritiferids

Unionids
Species

Subspecies
Catspaw (Epioblasma obliquata obliquata)
Rough rabbitsfoot (Quadrula cylindrica strigillata)

Other Unionida species

Venerida

Cephalopods
Cirroctopus hochbergi
Opisthoteuthis mero

See also 
 Lists of IUCN Red List endangered species
 List of least concern molluscs
 List of near threatened molluscs
 List of vulnerable molluscs
 List of critically endangered molluscs
 List of recently extinct molluscs
 List of data deficient molluscs

References 

Molluscs
Endangered molluscs